Placido Costanzi (1702–1759) was an Italian painter of the late-Baroque period.

Placido Costanzi was born in 1702 to a family of gem-makers in Rome. He was exposed to art at a very young age, and became a pupil of Benedetto Luti and painted mainly historical and devotional subjects.

He painted a St. Camillus in Santa Maria Maddalena in Florence, in which he has aspired to the imitation of Domenichino. 
Many of his works decorate Rome's churches. His Resuscitation of Tabitha in Santa Maria degli Angeli e dei Martiri replicates a mosaic in St. Peter's Basilica. He also painted in fresco the ceilings of the tribunes in Santa Maria in Vallicella and San Gregorio, and was much employed in painting figures in the landscapes of other artists, particularly in those of Jan Frans van Bloemen (also known as "Orizzonte", which means horizon in Italian).

In Rome he became a member of the prestigious Academy of Saint Luke, in which he served also as director (Principe) since 1758. One of his pupils was Pietro Antonio Gualdi Lodrini.

Costanzi also traveled to France and Spain.

Costanzi painted a portrait of George Keith, Earl Mareschal of Scotland, in Rome in 1752, now in the National Portrait Gallery, and St. Pancras & Infant Christ, now in the Dublin National Gallery.

References

Getty biography and Getty database record

1702 births
1759 deaths
Painters from Rome
18th-century Italian painters
Italian male painters
Rococo painters
18th-century Italian male artists